The Future Boys are Tyler Smith and Gary Patches, the lead characters from Steve Jordan's science fiction comedy plays Dead Static, Pilgrim Shadow and King Chaos. The plays make up a theatre series known as The Future Boys Trilogy, The plays are produced by Bad Bat Productions (previously ManMoth Productions), and star Cliff Chapman as Tyler and Adam Joselyn as Gary.

Productions
Dead Static, the first play in the trilogy, debuted in 2012 as part of the Camden Fringe Festival at the Etcetera Theatre, and later that year ran at the Hen and Chickens Theatre in Islington. The play tells the story of how the Future Boys met as strangers aboard a tiny shuttle in the middle of deep space. Tyler, a sarcastic, over-confident entrepreneur, finds himself trapped with Gary, an insufferably chirpy conman. The pair discover that Syndicate, the main antagonists of the series, have sentenced them both to death, and they have one hour to escape before their shuttle plunges nose-first into the asteroid belt.
Pilgrim Shadow, the second play in the trilogy, debuted in 2013 as part of the Camden Fringe Festival at the Tristan Bates Theatre in London’s West End. In this play, the Future Boys are now on the run from the Syndicate and live off their petty crimes. Gary steals a ship he believes to be the Pilgrim, the vessel of legendary treasure hunter Tim Shadow, and the pair embark on a quest to find his legendary lost treasure.
King Chaos, the third and final play in the trilogy, debuted in 2015 as part of the Camden Fringe Festival at the Tristan Bates Theatre in London’s West End. In this play, the Future boys overthrow the Syndicate and become rulers of the galaxy, only to start making things even worse than they were.

Audio Series
In 2016, writer and director Steve Jordan revealed that the team would be crowd-funding a pilot for a new audio series based on the Future Boys. In 2017, the live recording and digital release of 2 episodes of 'The Future Boys', a new audio sitcom, was successfully crowd-funded on Kickstarter. The episodes were released as a free download on iTunes in June 2017.

Fiction
In 2018, a novella entitled 'Empire of Monsters' was released featuring Tyler and Gary as secondary characters, set within their universe. In 2019, an eponymous novel was released telling the entire Future Boys saga, including the stories of the original plays.

Critical reception
Dead Static received mostly positive reviews from critics during its two theatre runs. James Bacon, writing for Forbidden Planet International, described the play as ‘a splendidly thoughtful and hilarious production’. Gareth Alexander described writer Steve Jordan as  ‘a comedy writer brought up right, learning from the best, but allowing himself his own spin on things’ in his 4 star review for Views from the Gods. Snipe London described the play as ‘certainly even funnier a space comedy than Red Dwarf’ and had 'the makings of a classic series'.

Pilgrim Shadow also drew praise from critics during its 2013 run. Tessa Hart described the sequel as ‘a hilarious, unusual Sci-Fi excursion’ in her 4 star review for Remote Goat. Some reviewers called for the pairing to move on to television. Gareth Alexander said that ‘if on TV ... their pairing I suspect would be seen as one of the greats’ during his 4 star review for Views from the Gods, and Camden Fringe Voyeur described both plays as ‘mini-sitcoms’ that ‘could be as good as anything on BBC Three’. The play also drew many comparisons with classic British comedy sitcoms, such as Blackadder, Red Dwarf, Bottom and Black Books.

King Chaos, the final play of the trilogy, also drew praise from its debut run in 2015. The team of creatives and actors were described as a ‘seriously hot talent in sci-fi’ comedy’ by Views from the Gods in their 4 star review, and its style of humour labelled ‘wonderful, clever comedy’ by Remote Goat. The plot and world-building were also praised. Female Arts said that ‘the arguments made for 'pragmatism versus idealism when in power' make a lasting impression, especially as Tyler and Gary are essentially Trinculo and Stefano (from The Tempest)’ in their 4 star review, and Camden Fringe Voyeur said the setting of the play was a ‘wonderfully silly and comic sci-fi universe that, with all its nods and winks to other works, stands very much on its own two feet.' A Younger Theatre remarked that the play would ‘make a great television show (Blackadder meets Dr Who)’ in their review.

References

Science fiction theatre